Syzygium sandwicense is a species of flowering plant in the myrtle family, Myrtaceae, that is endemic to Hawaii. Common names include Ōhia ha, Hā, and Pāihi.

References

sandwicense
Endemic flora of Hawaii
Trees of Hawaii
Flora without expected TNC conservation status